Mobile Suit Gundam: Federation vs. Zeon, known in Japan as  is a 2001 arcade video game based on the anime television series Mobile Suit Gundam.  An upgraded edition of the game, called  (DX stands for "Deluxe"), includes 360-degree, zero-G space battlefields. Both versions were later ported to the Dreamcast and PlayStation 2 game consoles.

Gameplay

The game follows the Universal Century (UC) Gundam time line and takes place during the infamous One Year War. The player is able to pilot various mobile suits and characters from the original Mobile Suit Gundam television series. There are three gaming modes: Arcade mode, Versus mode, and Campaign mode. Arcade mode allows to select two mobile suits depending on the side of the conflict chosen (Earth Federation or Principality of Zeon). 

The first mobile suit chosen is used for ground combat, while the second one is used in space environments. Versus mode allows two players to play on the same or opposing sides, with various maps and mobile suits available to choose from. The Campaign mode is centered on a player named soldier in the One Year War who combats the opposing side. Although in Campaign mode different mobile suits are unlocked as the campaign progresses. New mobile suits can be received by participating in test missions that involve that particular mobile suit. Exceptions are any captured enemy mobile suits, the Project V units (Gundam, RX-75 Guntank, and Guncannon), as well as all of Char Aznable's mobile suits (Zaku II, MSM-07 Z'Gok, Gelgoog, and MSN-02 Zeong).

Once Campaign Mode is defeated once, Extra Mode is unlocked, in which the player is granted top-notch allied mobile suits and all mobile suits from the opposing side as well (i.e. a Zeon pilot can use GM, a Federation suit). However, the AI becomes much harder than normal mode and if a suit is destroyed, it is not replaced. Also awarded when beating the regular Campaign Mode is the availability of all Mobile Suits in Versus and Arcade Modes.

Release

Reception

The PlayStation 2 version received "average" reviews according to the review aggregation website Metacritic.

In Japan, Famitsu gave both the PS2 and Dreamcast versions each a score of 32 out of 40. Game Machine listed the arcade version of Mobile Suit Gundam: Federation vs. Zeon in their May 1, 2001 issue as the most popular arcade game of the month; twelve issues later, it also listed Mobile Suit Gundam: Federation vs. Zeon DX in the same way in their November 1, 2001 issue. It went on to be the fourth highest-grossing arcade software of 2001 in Japan. Mobile Suit Gundam: Federation vs. Zeon also ranked tenth placed for the Japanese overall highest-grossing arcade game of 2001, blocked from the top five by Virtua Striker 2 ver. 2000, Shakatto Tambourine, and Time Crisis 2.

Notes

References

External links
 
 
 

2001 video games
Arcade video games
Bandai games
Banpresto games
Capcom games
Dreamcast games
Gundam video games
Infogrames games
PlayStation 2 games